Golf arrived in Thailand during the reign of King Rama V at the Royal Bangkok Sports Club and Royal Hua Hin Golf Course.  It was first played by nobles and other elites of high society but is now played by a wider segment of the population.  Retail and fashion industries golf promotions are popular in the Si Lom Road part of Bangkok in Thaniya Plaza shopping mall. 

As of 2022, there are approximately 300 golf courses in Thailand. 124 golf courses were built between 1990-1995.  An estimated 700,000 tourists fly into Thailand every year to play golf.  Destination diversity and the choice of golf courses throughout the country are key factors attracting the large numbers of visitors coming to play golf in Thailand. The most popular destination for golfing in Thailand especially for tourists is the Chonburi Province, where there are 27 golf courses.

Significant Golf Tournament History 

Honda LPGA Thailand is an annual LPGA tournament held at Siam Country Club, Pattaya Old Course
 The 1998 Johnnie Walker Classic was won by Tiger Woods at Blue Canyon in Phuket.
 Thailand Golf Championship was a professional golf tournament on the Asian Tour held at Amata Spring Country Club in Chonburi province from 2011 - 2015.
 The Asia-Pacific Amateur Championship was held at Amata Spring Country Club in Chonburi province in 2012 and 2022.
 Portmarnock won the 2016 World Club Championship at Ayodhya Links hosted by Pitak Intrawityanunt.
Black Mountain in Cha Am has hosted a number of European Tour and Asian Tour professional events: True Thailand Classic, Black Mountain Masters, 2011 Royal Trophy
Santiburi Koh Samui hosted the Asian Tour Queen's Cup a number of times.

Thailand's Professional Golfers 

Thailand's female golfers have won major championships and reached the #1 world ranking, notably Ariya Jutanugarn, Atthaya Thitikul, Patty Tavatanakit, Moriya Jutanugarn.

Male golfers Thongchai Jaidee, Kiradech Aphibarnrat, Prayad Marksaeng, Boonchu Ruangkit, Pornanong Phatlum have had international success as winners.  Many Thai professional golfers and aspiring amateurs compete in All Thailand Golf Tour tournaments.

Thailand's Golf Courses 
331 Golf Club
ACDC Golf Course
Ait Golf Club
Alpine Golf and Sports Club
Alpine Golf Resort Chiang Mai
Amata Spring Country Club
Aquella Country Club
Artitaya Country Club (Bangkok Royal Country Club)
Ayodhya Links
Ayutthaya Golf Club
Bangkok Golf Club
Bangna Navy Golf Course
Bangpakong Riverside Golf
Bangpoo Golf and Sport Club
Bangpra International Golf Club
Bangsai Country Club
Banyan Golf Club
Best Ocean Golf
Bhumibol Dam Golf Course
Black Mountain Golf Club
Blue Canyon, Canyon
Blue Canyon, Lakes
Blue Sapphire Golf and Resort
Blue Star Golf Course
Bodindecha Golf Club
Bonanza Golf and Country Club
Burapha
Cascata Golf Club
Chatrium Golf Resort Soi Dao Chanthaburi
Chee Chan Golf Course
Chiang Mai Inthanon Golf Resort
Chiangmai Gymkhana Club
Chiangmai Highlands Golf and Spa Resort
Chaophraya Dam Golf Course
Chonburi Century Country Club
Chuan Chuen Golf Club
Chulabhorn Dam Golf Course
Crystal Bay
Crystal Lake Golf Club
Dancoon Golf Club
Dhupatemiya Golf Course
Dongpukurd Golf Course
Dragon Hills Golf and Country Club
Dynasty Golf and Country Club
Eastern Star Golf Course
Ekachai Golf and Country Club
Emerald Golf Club
Evergreen Hills Golf Club and Resort
Flora Ville Chuan Chuen Golf Club
Forest Hills Country Club, Sir James Country Club
Friendship Meadows Country Club
Gassan Khuntan Golf and Resort
Gassan Legacy Golf Club
Gassan Panorama
Gold Canyon Country Club
Grand Prix Golf Club
Great Lake Golf and Country Club
Green Valley Bangkok
Greenwood Golf Club
Hang Dong Golf Club, Chiangmai
Happy City Golf Resort
Hariphunchai Golf Club
Hat Yai Resort and Golf Club
Hillside Country Home
Iyara Golf Course
Jiraprawat Golf Course
Jompol Por Golf Course
Jungle Golf Club
Kabinburi Sportclub
Kaeng Krachan Country Club and Resort
Kantarat Golf Course
Katathong Golf and Resort
Ket Udomsak Golf Club
Khao ChaNgok Golf and Country Club
Khao Kheow Country Club
Khao Yai Golf Club
Kiarti Thanee Country Club
Kirimaya Golf Club (The Country Club KhaoYai)
Kirinara Golf Course
Koh Hong Golf Club
Korat Country Club Golf and Resort
Krisda City Golf Hills
Krung Kavee Golf Course and Country Club
Krungthep Kreetha Sports Club
Kumlung-Ake Golf Course
Laem Chabang International
Laguna Phuket Golf Club
Lakewood Country Club
Lam Luk Ka Country Club
Lanna Golf Course
Life Privilege, Mission Hills
Loch Palm Golf Club
Lotus Valley Golf Resort
Mae Jo Golf Club and Resort
Mae Kok Golf Course, Mueang Chiang Rai
Mae Moh Golf Course
Mida Golf Club (The Lion Hills Golf and Country Club)
Milford Golf Club (Hua Hin Seoul Country Club)
Mission Hills Phuket Golf Resort and Spa
Mountain Creek Resort
Mountain Shadow
Muang Ake Golf Course
Muang Ake Vista Golf Course
Muang Ake Wang Noi Golf Course
Muang Kaew Golf Course
My Ozone Golf Club Khao Yai
Narai Hill Golf and Country Club
Navatanee Golf Course
NCR Golf and Resort
Nichigo Resort and Country Club
Nikanti Golf Club
Nong Samrong Golf Course
North Hill Golf Club
Northern Rangsit Golf Club
Pak Chong Country Club
Palm Hills Golf Club and Residence
Panorama Golf and Country Club
Panurangsri Golf Course
Panya Indra Golf Club
Parichat International Golf Links
Pattana Golf Club and Resort
Pattavia Century Golf Club
Pattaya Country Club and Resort
Phoenix Gold Golf and Country Club
Phutthalung Golf Club
Plutaluang Royal Thai Navy Golf Course
Phu Kradae Golf Course (Nakhon Phanom University Course)
Phuket Country Club
Pinehurst Golf Club
Pleasant Valley Golf Course
Plutaluang Royal Thai Navy Golf Course
Praphasi Golf Club
President Country Club
Prime City Golf Club
Rachakram Golf Club
Rajjaprabha Dam Golf Course
Rajpruek Club
Rancho Charnvee Country Club
Rangsit Sports Club
Rayong Green Valley
Recruit Training Center Golf Course
Red Mountain Golf Club
Riverdale Golf Club
Roi Et Golf Club
Rooks Korat Country Club Golf and Resort
Rose Garden Golf Club
Royal Bangpa In Golf Course
Royal Chiang Mai Golf Resort
Royal Creek Golf Club and Resort
Royal Dusit Golf Club
Royal Hills Golf Resort
Royal Hua Hin Golf Course
Royal Irrigation Dept. Golf Course
Royal Lakeside Golf Club
Royal Ratchaburi Golf Club
Royal Samui Golf and Country Club
Royal Thai Air Force Golf Course (Thong Yai)
Royal Thai Army Sports Center (New Course)
Royal Thai Army Sports Center (Old Course)
Royal Thai Fleet Golf Course A
Royal Thai Fleet Golf Course B
Royal Thai Fleet Golf Course C
Salaya Naval Golf Course
Sand Creek Golf Course
Santiburi Golf Club Chiang Rai
Santiburi Samui Country Club
Sawang Resort Golf Club
Sea Pine Golf Course
Siam Country Club (Old Course)
Siam Country Club Bangkok
Siam Country Club Plantation
Siam Country Club Waterside
Siam Rolling Hills
Siharatdechochai Golf Course
Silky Oaks
Silver Star Golf Course
Singha Park Khon Kaen Golf Club
Sirindhorn Dam Golf Course
Southern Hills Golf and Country Club
Springfield Royal Country Club
Sri Nakarin Dam Golf Course
St Andrews 2000
Star Dome Golf Club (Wing 41)
Stonehill Golf Club
Subhapruek Golf Course
Suer Park Golf Club
Summit Green Valley Chiangmai Country Club
Summit Windmill Golf Club
Sunrise Lagoon Hotel and Golf
Suranaree Golf Course
Surin Army Golf Course (Fort Weerawatyothin)
Suvarnabhumi Golf and Country Club
Suwan Golf and Country Club
Tanyatanee Country Club
Thai Country Club
Thai Marine Golf Course Bangsaray
Thai Muang Beach Golf
Thana City
Thanarat Golf Club
Thanont Golf View
Thanya Golf Club
The Banyan Golf Club
The Emerald Golf Club
The Imperial Lake View Hotel and Golf Club
The Legacy Golf Club
The Majestic Creek Country Club
The Pine Golf and Lodge (Nongjok Golf Club)
The Royal Bangkok Sports Club
The Royal Gems Golf and Sports Club
The Royal Gems Golf City
The Royal Golf and Country Club
The Vintage Club
Thong Yai Golf Course
Tiger Wing Golf Club
Tongthai Banrai Golf Course
Toscana Valley
Treasure Hill
Tungsong Golf Course
Ubonrat Golf Course
Ubolratana Dam
Udon Golf Club and Resort
Unico Grande Golf Course
Uniland Golf and Country Club
Victory Park Golf and Country Club
Wangjuntr Golf Park
Waterford Valley, Chiangrai
Watermill Golf
Windsor Park and Golf Club
Wing 21 Golf Club
Wing 23 Golf Course
Wangjuntr Golf Park
Windsor Park and Golf Club
Woo Sung Castle Hill Country Club

References